The POLSKA '93 World Philatelic Exhibition was an international stamp exhibition held 7–16 May 1993 in Poznan, Poland. The exhibition was granted patronage from the  Fédération Internationale de Philatélie (FIP).

Palmares
The Grand Prix awards went to the following exhibits:

The Grand Prix d'Honneur went to Raymond Casey (U.K.) for Russian Posts in the Far East.

The Grand Prix International went to Peng Hian Tay (Singapore) for Burma 1817–54.

The Grand Prix National went to Maciej Miszczak (Poland) for Polish pre-adhesive and classic stamps (Polskie znaki pocztowe w XVIII i XIX
wieku).

References

Further reading
Nadstoga, Zbigniew. Światowa Wystawa Filatelistyczna "Polska'93" = World Philatelic Exhibition : Poznań 7-16 V 1993. Poznań: Komitet Organizacyjny ŚWF "Polska'93", 1993 62p.

2017